Aub is a town in Germany.

Aub or AUB may also refer to:

People with the name

Surname 
 Carmen Aub (born 1989), Mexican actress
 Joseph Charles Aub (1890-1973), American endocrinologist
 Joseph Aub (rabbi) (1804–1880), German rabbi
 Max Aub (1903–1972), Mexican-Spanish novelist, playwright and critic

Given name 
 Aub Carrigan (1917–2012), Australian cricketer 
 Aub Charleston (1901–1985), Australian rules footballer
 Aub Hodgson (1912–1982), Australian rugby union player
 Aub Kelly (1904–1974), Australian Rugby league player
 Aub Lawson (1915–1977), Australian speedway rider

Groups, companies, organizations 
African Union of Broadcasting, association of national radio and television organizations in Africa 
Augsburg Airways (ICAO airline code AUB), a defunct regional German airline

Banks
Asia United Bank, based in the Philippines
Asia Universal Bank, based in Kyrgyzstan

Religious organizations
Anjuman-i-Ulama-i-Bangala, defunct Islamic organisation based in British Bengal
Apostolic United Brethren, a polygamous Mormon fundamentalist church

Universities
American University of Beirut, Lebanon
Andrássy University Budapest, Hungary
Arts University Bournemouth, Poole, United Kingdom 
Asian University of Bangladesh, Dhaka

Other uses
Abnormal uterine bleeding, a menstrual condition
Phupha language (ISO 639 language code aub)

See also

 
 
 
 Aube (disambiguation)